West of the Pecos is a 1934 American Western film directed by Phil Rosen and starring Richard Dix and Martha Sleeper. The screenplay was written Milton Krims and John Twist, who adapted the serial of the same name by Zane Grey, appearing beginning in The American Magazine in 1931 and later as the 1937 novel. The film, which is thought to be lost, was remade as West of the Pecos in 1945.

References

External links

Films produced by Cliff Reid
Films directed by Phil Rosen
RKO Pictures films
American Western (genre) films
1934 Western (genre) films
1934 films
American black-and-white films
1930s American films